The mayor of Hackney is a directly elected mayor responsible for the executive function of Hackney London Borough Council in London, England. The inaugural holder Jules Pipe was succeeded by Philip Glanville following an election on 15 September 2016.

Referendum

Elections

2022

2018

2016

2014

2010

2006

2002

List of elected mayors
The mayors since the office was created in 2002 have been:

References

Hackney